Leonard Langford (30 May 1899 – 26 December 1973) was an English footballer. His regular position was as a goalkeeper. He was born in Alfreton, Derbyshire. He played for Manchester City, Manchester United, and Nottingham Forest.

External links
profile

1899 births
1973 deaths
English footballers
Manchester United F.C. players
Manchester City F.C. players
Nottingham Forest F.C. players
People from Alfreton
Footballers from Derbyshire
Association football goalkeepers
FA Cup Final players